World of Morrissey is a compilation album released in 1995 by Morrissey. It was one of three Morrissey releases EMI deleted from its catalogue on 14 December 2010 along with Beethoven Was Deaf & Suedehead: The Best of Morrissey.  The album's cover art features boxer Cornelius Carr.

Track listing
 "Whatever Happens, I Love You" – 3:07 [B-side of "Boxers"]
 "Billy Budd" – 2:09 [from Vauxhall and I]
 "Jack the Ripper" [live in Paris, 22 December 1992] – 4:10 [from Beethoven Was Deaf]
 "Have-a-Go Merchant" – 2:41 [B-side of "Boxers"]
 "The Loop" – 4:16 [B-side of "Sing Your Life"]
 "Sister I'm a Poet" [live in Paris, 22 December 1992] – 2:15 [from "Beethoven Was Deaf"]
 "You're the One for Me, Fatty" [live in Paris, 22 December 1992] – 3:00 [from Beethoven Was Deaf]
 "Boxers" – 3:28 [single A-side]
 "Moon River" – 9:39 [B-side of "Hold on to Your Friends"]
 "My Love Life" [UK version] – 4:24 [single A-side]
 "Certain People I Know" – 3:10 [from Your Arsenal]
 "The Last of the Famous International Playboys" – 3:36 [single A-side]
 "We'll Let You Know" – 5:16 [from Your Arsenal]
 "Spring-Heeled Jim" – 3:45 [from Vauxhall and I]

References

Morrissey albums
B-side compilation albums
1995 compilation albums
Parlophone compilation albums